KBRO-LD, virtual channel 34 (VHF digital channel 2), is a low-powered television station serving Fort Collins, Colorado that is licensed to Lyons. The station is owned by Echonet Corporation, a company majority owned by Dish Network chairman Charlie Ergen.

History
In the 1980s, the then-K49AY carried a combination of Home Shopping Network and Spanish-language programming, serving Cheyenne, Wyoming. In 2000, it rebroadcast ABC affiliate KMGH (channel 7) in Denver.

K49AY was shut down on October 22, 2002, following the FCC fining the station for $10,000 for being on the air with an improper license, following its renewal. The fine was lowered to $4000, after it convinced the FCC that it was a clerical error on their part.

K49AY remerged in 2005, carrying Almavision programming.

The station was licensed for digital operation on June 24, 2015, changing the call sign to K16LE-D. On July 17, 2015, the call letters were changed to KBRO-LD. Echonet Corporation had earlier held a construction permit for a digital low power station (K18II-D) in Cheyenne that would have broadcast on UHF channel 18.

Effective April 10, 2019, KBRO-LD was licensed to move its community of license from Cheyenne to Fort Collins.

References

External links
Official Almavision website

BRO-LD
Television channels and stations established in 1986
1986 establishments in Wyoming
Low-power television stations in the United States
ATSC 3.0 television stations